Kandaswami Kandar's College is a general degree college located in Velur, Namakkal district, Tamil Nadu. It was established in the year 1967. The college is affiliated with Periyar University. It offers different courses in arts, commerce and science.

Departments

Science
Physics
Chemistry
Mathematics
Botany
Zoology
Computer Science

Arts and Commerce
Tamil
English
History
Physical Education
Economics
Business Administration
Commerce

Accreditation
The college is  recognized by the University Grants Commission (UGC).

References

External links

Educational institutions established in 1967
1967 establishments in Madras State
Colleges affiliated to Periyar University